CSPC may refer to:

The Center for the Study of the Presidency and Congress, a D.C-based think-tank.
The Center for Sex Positive Culture in Seattle, Washington
The David Horowitz Freedom Center, founded in the 1980s by political activist David Horowitz; formerly the Center for the Study of Popular Culture.  The center changed its name in July 2006.
Canadian Standard Product Code (similar to Stock-keeping unit (SKU)).
Community specialist palliative care
California State Prison, Corcoran, a prison in the US state of California.
 The International Stress Prevention Center, a NGO in North Israel.
 Shijiazhuang Pharma Group